Sukhumi or Sukhum, also known by its Georgian name Sokhumi or Abkhaz name Aqwa (Aqwa), is a city in a wide bay on the Black Sea's eastern coast. It is both the capital and largest city of the Republic of Abkhazia, which has controlled it since the Abkhazia war in 1992–93. However, internationally Abkhazia is considered part of Georgia. The city, which has an airport, is a port, major rail junction and a holiday resort because of its beaches, sanatoriums, mineral-water spas and semitropical climate. It is also a member of the International Black Sea Club.

Sukhumi's history can be traced to the 6th century BC, when it was settled by Greeks, who named it Dioscurias. During this time and the subsequent Roman period, much of the city disappeared under the Black Sea. The city was named Tskhumi when it became part of the Kingdom of Abkhazia and then the Kingdom of Georgia. Contested by local princes, it became part of the Ottoman Empire in the 1570s, where it remained until it was conquered by the Russian Empire in 1810. After a period of conflict during the Russian Civil War, it became part of the independent Georgia, which included Abkhazia, in 1918. In 1921, the Democratic Republic of Georgia was occupied by Soviet Bolshevik forces from Russia. Within the Soviet Union, it was regarded as a holiday resort. As the Soviet Union broke up in the early 1990s, the city suffered significant damage during the Abkhaz–Georgian conflict. The present-day population of 60,000 is only half of the population living there toward the end of Soviet rule.

Toponym
In Georgian, the city is known as Sokhumi (სოხუმი), amongst Samurzakans in Megrelian the city is sometimes referred to as Aqujikha (აყუჯიხა), and in Russian as Сухум (Sukhum) or Сухуми (Sukhumi). The toponym Sokhumi derives from the Georgian word Tskhomi/Tskhumi (ცხომი/ცხუმი), which in turn is supposed to be derived from Svan tskhum (ცხუმ) meaning "hornbeam tree". In Abkhaz, the city is known as Aqwa (Аҟәа) which is believed to derive from a-qwara (а-ҟәара), meaning "stony seashore". According to Abkhaz tradition Aqwa (Аҟәа) signifies water.

Medieval Georgian sources knew the town as Tskhumi (ცხუმი). Later, under Ottoman control, the town was known in Turkish as Suhum-Kale, which was derived from the earlier Georgian form Tskhumi or read to mean "Tskhumi fortress".

The ending -i in the above forms represents the Georgian nominative suffix. The town was officially called Сухум (Sukhum) in Russian until 16 August 1936, when this was changed to Sukhumi (Сухуми). This remained so until 4 December 1992, when the Supreme Council of Abkhazia restored the previous version. Russia also readopted its official spelling in 2008, though Сухуми is also still being used.

In English, the most common form today is Sukhumi, although Sokhumi is increasing in usage and has been adopted by sources including United Nations, Encyclopædia Britannica, MSN Encarta, Esri and Google Maps.

History
The history of the city began in the mid-6th century BC when an earlier settlement of the second and early first millennia BC, frequented by local Colchian tribes, was replaced by the Milesian Greek colony of Dioscurias. The city is said to have been founded and named by the Dioscuri, the twins Castor and Pollux of classical mythology. According to another legend it was founded by Amphitus and Cercius of Sparta, the charioteers of the Dioscuri. The Greek pottery found in Eshera, further north along the coast, predates findings in the area of Sukhumi bay by a century suggesting that the centre of the original Greek settlement could have been there.

It became busily engaged in the commerce between Greece and the indigenous tribes, importing salt and wares from many parts of Greece, and exporting local timber, linen, and hemp. It was also a prime center of slave trade in Colchis. The city and its surroundings were remarkable for the multitude of languages spoken in its bazaars.

Although the sea made serious inroads upon the territory of Dioscurias, it continued to flourish and became one of the key cities in the realm of Mithridates VI of Pontus  in the 2nd century BC and supported his cause until the end. Dioscurias issued   bronze coinage around 100 BC featuring the symbols of the Dioskuri and Dionysus. Under the Roman emperor Augustus the city assumed the name of Sebastopolis. But its prosperity was past, and in the 1st century Pliny the Elder described the place as virtually deserted though the town still continued to exist during the times of Arrian in the 130s. The remains of towers and walls of Sebastopolis have been found underwater; on land the lowest levels so far reached by archaeologists are of the 1st and 2nd centuries AD. According to Gregory of Nyssa there were Christians in the city in the late 4th century.  In 542 the Romans evacuated the town and demolished its citadel to prevent it from being captured by Sasanian Empire. In 565, however, the emperor Justinian I restored the fort and Sebastopolis continued to remain one of the Byzantine strongholds in Colchis until being sacked by the Arab conqueror Marwan II in 736.

Afterwards, the town came to be known as Tskhumi. Restored by the kings of Abkhazia from the Arab devastation, it particularly flourished during the Georgian Golden Age in the 12th–13th centuries, when Tskhumi became a center of traffic with the European maritime powers, particularly with the Republic of Genoa. Early in the 14th century the Genoese established their short-lived trading factory in Tskhumi and a Catholic bishopric existed there which is now a titular see. The city of Tskhumi became the summer residence of the Georgian kings. According to Russian scholar V. Sizov, it became an important “cultural and administrative center of the Georgian state. A  Later Tskhumi served as capital of the Odishi — Megrelian rulers, it was in this city that Vamek I ( 1384–1396), the most influential Dadiani, minted his coins. Documents of the 15th century clearly distinguished Tskhumi from Principality of Abkhazia. The Ottoman navy occupied the town in 1451, but for a short time. Later contested between the princes of Abkhazia and Mingrelia, Tskhumi finally fell to the Turks in the 1570s. The new masters heavily fortified the town and called it Sohumkale, with kale meaning "fort" but the first part of the name of disputed origin. It may represent Turkish su, "water", and kum, "sand", but is more likely to be an alteration of its earlier Georgian name.

At the request of the pro-Russian Abkhazian prince, the town was stormed by the Russian Marines in 1810 and turned, subsequently, into a major outpost in the North West Caucasus. (See Russian conquest of the Caucasus). Sukhumi was declared the seaport in 1847 and was directly annexed to the Russian Empire after the ruling Shervashidze princely dynasty was ousted by the Russian authorities in 1864. During the Russo-Turkish War, 1877–1878, the town was temporarily controlled by the Ottoman forces and Abkhaz-Adyghe rebels. After its annexation, Sukhumi became the administrative center of the Sukhumi Okrug of the Kutais Governorate.

Following the Russian Revolution of 1917, the town and Abkhazia in general were engulfed in the chaos of the Russian Civil War. A short-lived Bolshevik government was suppressed in May 1918 and Sukhumi was incorporated into the Democratic Republic of Georgia as a residence of the autonomous People's Council of Abkhazia and the headquarters of the Georgian governor-general. The Red Army and the local revolutionaries took the city from the Georgian forces on 4 March 1921, and declared Soviet rule. Sukhumi functioned as the capital of the "Union treaty" Abkhaz Soviet Socialist Republic associated with the Georgian SSR from 1921 until 1931, when it became the capital of the Abkhazian Autonomous Soviet Socialist Republic within the Georgian SSR. By 1989, Sukhumi had 120,000 inhabitants and was one of the most prosperous cities of Georgia. Many holiday dachas for Soviet leaders were situated there.

Beginning with the 1989 riots, Sukhumi was a centre of the Georgian-Abkhaz conflict, and the city was severely damaged during the 1992–1993 War. During the war, the city and its environs suffered almost daily air strikes and artillery shelling, with heavy civilian casualties. On 27 September 1993 the battle for Sukhumi was concluded by a full-scale campaign of ethnic cleansing against its majority Georgian population (see Sukhumi Massacre), including members of the pro-Georgian Abkhazian government (Zhiuli Shartava, Raul Eshba and others) and mayor of Sukhumi Guram Gabiskiria. 
Although the city has been relatively peaceful and partially rebuilt, it is still suffering the after-effects of the war, and it has not regained its earlier ethnic diversity. A relatively large infrastructure reconstruction program was launched in 2019–2020 focusing on the renovation of the waterfront, rebuilding city roads and cleaning city parks. Its population in 2017 was 65,716, compared to about 120,000 in 1989. During summer holidays season its population usually doubles and triples with a large inflow of international tourists.

In 2021, there was unrest in the city.

Population

Demographics
Historic population figures for Sukhumi, split out by ethnicity, based on population censuses:

 The Abkhazians were deemed "guilty" from 1877, but officially it was by an order of the tsar of 31 May 1880 that their "guilt" was recognised. Abkhazians were forbidden to settle near the coast (except for the upper classes), or live in Sukhum. The devastated central part of Abkhazia between the rivers Psyrtskha and Kodor became a colonised land-fund of the imperial administration. There was established here a kind of buffer-zone between the Gudauta and Ochamchira Abkhazians. Abkhazians had no right to settle in this part of their own country. Meanwhile, thousands of Armenians, Mingrelians, Greeks, Russians, Estonians, Germans, Moldovans and others who were resettled began from 1879 to take root here in today's Sukhum and Gulripsh districts.

Religion 
Most of the inhabitants belong to the Orthodox and Armenian Apostolic Churches, Islam and the Abkhaz traditional religion.

Culture

Main sights 
Sukhumi theatres which offer classical and modern performances, with the theatre season lasting from September to June. Several galleries and museums exhibit modern and historical Abkhaz visual art. Sukhumi Botanical Garden was established in 1840 and is one of the oldest botanical gardens in the Caucasus.

Sukhumi houses a number of historical monuments, notably the Besleti Bridge built during the reign of queen Tamar of Georgia in the 12th century. It also retains visible vestiges of the defunct monuments, including the Roman walls, the medieval Castle of Bagrat, several towers of the Kelasuri Wall, also known as Great Abkhazian Wall, constructed between 1628 and 1653 by Levan II Dadiani to protect his fiefdom from the Abkhaz tribes; the 14th-century Genoese fort and the 18th-century Ottoman fortress. The 11th century Kamani Monastery ( from Sukhumi) is erected, according to tradition, over the tomb of Saint John Chrysostom. Some  from Sukhumi lies New Athos with the ruins of the medieval city of Anacopia. The Neo-Byzantine New Athos Monastery was constructed here in the 1880s on behest of Tsar Alexander III of Russia.
 
Northward in the mountains is the Krubera Cave, one of the deepest in the world, with a depth of 2,140 meters.

Education  
The city hosts a number of research and educational institutions, including the Abkhazian State University, the Sukhumi Open Institute and about a half a dozen of vocational education colleges. From 1945 to 1954 the city's electron physics laboratory was involved in the Soviet program to develop nuclear weapons. Additionally, the Abkhaz State Archive is located in the city.

Until 19th century young people from Abkhazia usually received their education mainly at religious schools (Muslims at Madrasas and Christians at Seminaries), although a small number of children from wealthy families had opportunity to travel to foreign countries for education.

The first modern educational institutions (both schools and colleges) were established in the late 19th-early 20th century and rapidly grew until the second half of the 20th century. For example, the number of college students grew from few dozens in the 1920s to several thousands in the 1980s.

According to the official statistical data, Abkhazia has 12 TVET colleges (as of 2019, est.) providing education and vocational training to youth mostly in the capital city, though there are several colleges in all major district centers. Independent international assessments suggest that these colleges train in about 20 different specialties attracting between 1200 and 1500 young people annually (aged between 16 and 29) (as of 2019, est.). The largest colleges are as follows:

 Abkhaz Multiindustrial College (1959) (from 1959 to 1999 – Sukhumi Trade and Culinary School),
 Sukhumi State College (1904) (from 1904 to 1921 – Sukhumi Real School; from 1921 to 1999 – Sukhumi Industrial Technical School),
 Sukhumi Art College (1934) (from 1934 to 1966 – Sukhimi Art Studio). This college is also a home for a relatively large collection of local paintings and sculptures accumulated mainly during past 60 years. 
 Sukhum Medical College (1931)

Higher education in Sukhumi currently is represented by one university, Abkhazian State University, which has a special status in the education system in Abkhazia and it manages its own budget.

Abkhaz State University (1979), has its own campus which is a home for 42 departments organized into 8 faculties providing education to about 3300 students (as of 2019, est.).

Climate 
Sukhumi has a humid subtropical climate (Köppen Cfa), that is almost cool enough in summer to be an oceanic climate (Cfb).

Administration 
On 2 February 2000, President Ardzinba dismissed temporary Mayor Leonid Osia and appointed Leonid Lolua in his stead. Lolua was reappointed on 10 May 2001 following the March 2001 local elections.

On 5 November 2004, in the heated aftermath of the 2004 presidential election, president Vladislav Ardzinba appointed head of the Gulripshi District assembly Adgur Kharazia as acting mayor. During his first speech he called upon the two leading candidates, Sergei Bagapsh and Raul Khadjimba, to both withdraw.

On 16 February 2005, after his election as president, Bagapsh replaced Kharazia with Astamur Adleiba, who had been Minister for Youth, Sports, Resorts and Tourism until December 2004. In the 11 February 2007 local elections, Adleiba successfully defended his seat in the Sukhumi city assembly and was thereupon reappointed mayor by Bagapsh on 20 March.

In April 2007, while President Bagapsh was in Moscow for medical treatment, the results of an investigation into corruption within the Sukhumi city administration were made public. The investigation found that large sums had been embezzled and upon his return, on 2 May, Bagapsh fired Adleiba along with his deputy Boris Achba, the head of the Sukhumi's finance department Konstantin Tuzhba and the head of the housing department David Jinjolia. On 4 June Adleiba paid back to the municipal budget 200,000 rubels. and on 23 July, he resigned from the Sukhumi city council, citing health reasons and the need to travel abroad for medical treatment.

On 15 May 2007, president Bagapsh released Alias Labakhua as First Deputy Chairman of the State Customs Committee and appointed him acting Mayor of Sukhumi, a post temporarily fulfilled by former Vice-Mayor Anzor Kortua. On 27 May Labakhua appointed Vadim Cherkezia as Deputy Chief of staff. On 2 September, Labakhua won the by-election in constituency No. 21, which had become necessary after Adleiba relinquished his seat. Adleiba was the only candidate and voter turnout was 34%, higher than the 25% required. Since Adleiba was now a member of the city assembly, president Bagapsh could permanently appoint him Mayor of Sukhumi on 18 September.

Following the May 2014 Revolution and the election of Raul Khajimba as president, he on 22 October dismissed Labakhua and again appointed (as acting Mayor) Adgur Kharazia, who at that point was Vice Speaker of the People's Assembly. Kharazia won the 4 April 2015 by-election to the City Council in constituency no. 3 unopposed, and was confirmed as mayor by Khajimba on 4 May. The 6th convocation of the Sukhumi City Council was elected 13 April 2016.

List of mayors

Transport 

Sukhumi is served by the Sukhumi Trolleybus, consisting of 3 Lines.

There is a railway station in Sukhumi, that has a daily train to Moscow via Sochi.

Babushara Airport now handles only local flights due to the disputed status of Abkhazia.

Notable people 
Notable people who are from or have resided in Sukhumi:

 Anton Alikhanov (1986–present), Russian politician, governor of Kaliningrad Oblast
 Alexander Ankvab (1952–present), Abkhaz politician and businessman, Prime Minister of Abkhazia.
 Beslan Ajinjal (1974–present), is a former Russian footballer.
 Ruslan Ajinjal (1974–present), is a former Russian-Abkhazian footballer.
 Otari Arshba (1955–present), Russian politician and member of the State Duma of the Russian Federation.
 Hadzhera Avidzba (1917–1997), Abkhazia's first professional pianist.
 Meri Avidzba (1917–1986), Abkhaz female pilot who fought during the Great Patriotic War of 1942–1945.
 Verdicenan Achba (1825–1889), seventh wife of Sultan Abdulmejid I of the Ottoman Empire.
 Sergei Bagapsh (1949–2011), Second President of the Republic of Abkhazia
 Guram Gabiskiria (1947–1993), Mayor of Sukhumi and National Hero of Georgia.
 Demna Gvasalia (1981–present), Georgian fashion designer. 
 Fazil Iskander (1929–2016), Russian writer and poet.
 Sergey Kiriyenko (1962–present),  Russian politician, First Deputy Chief of Staff of the Presidential Administration of Russia.
 Vera Kobalia (1981–present), Georgian politician.
 Daur Kove (1979–present), current Minister for Foreign Affairs of Abkhazia.
 Kokkai Futoshi (1981–present), former professional sumo wrestler.

International relations

Twin towns — Sister cities
Sukhumi is twinned with the following cities:
 Ufa, Russia
 Krasnodar, Russia
 Tiraspol, Transnistria, Moldova
 Cherkessk, Russia
 Podolsk, Russia
 Volgograd, Russia
 Grozny, Russia
 Stepanakert, Artsakh/Azerbaijan (disputed)
 Arkhangelsk, Russia
 Nizhny Novgorod, Russia
 Sant'Antioco, Italy
 Side, Turkey
 Managua, Nicaragua

See also 

 Sukhumi District
 List of twin towns and sister cities in Georgia

References

Sources and external links

 GigaCatholic for the titular see, linking to incumbent biographies
 UNOMIG photo gallery of Sukhumi

 
Milesian Pontic colonies
Capitals in Asia
Capitals in Europe
Port cities in Asia
Port cities in Europe
Port cities of the Black Sea
Greek colonies in Colchis
Georgian Black Sea coast
Sukhum Okrug
Populated places in Abkhazia
Populated places established in the 6th century BC